Gabriele Mandel (12 February 1924 in Bologna - 1 July 2010 in Milan) was an Italian islamist, psychologist, writer, and artist of Afghan descent. He was also known by the names of Gabriele Mandel Khān and Gabriele Sugana. He was also a Sufi guide (shaikh) in the Jerrahi Order.

Early life and education

Mandel was the son of the Sufi and historian Yusuf Roberto Mandel (of Turco-Afghan descent) and of the Jewish Writer Carlotta Rimini. His godfather was the poet Gabriele D'Annunzio. A Muslim, Mandel promoted interfaith dialogue and peace-building throughout his life.

In his youth Mandel studied music at the Conservatory of Vicenza, graduating in violin and harmony. After WWII (during which, along with his father, he was imprisoned and tortured by Nazis) he studied classical languages and literature and did extensive archaeological field research in India and in the Middle East, which he subsequently published. Later he developed scientific interests and graduated first in psychology and then as a medical doctor at the Faculty of Medicine of Pavia.

Career
After the training he  began working as a psychotherapist, an activity that he continued during his life, in parallel with that of ceramist and writer. He wrote nearly two hundred books –many of which were translated into several languages- on subjects ranging from art history and calligraphy to Sufism. His ceramics have been exhibited throughout the world.

Mandel taught psychology and art history in various faculties in Italy, France, and Belgium. Also, among his multifaceted activities was journalism, which he began in 1939, writing Sufi novels for Corriere dei Piccoli, a youth-oriented supplement of the magazine Corriere della Sera.

Like his Afghan uncle, Keki Efendi Khan-i Rud Hetimandel, Mandel was attracted to Sufism (Islamic mysticism). Mandel was a pupil of Si Hamza Boubakeur (rector of the Paris Mosque, d. 1995), a Naqshbandi. Later he joined the Khalwati (sub-Order: Jerrahi) Sufi Order and became its deputy (khalifa) in Italy, leading the Tekke in Milan until his death. Mandel translated the Qur'an into Italian with an extensive Sufi commentary and edited an Italian translation of the Mathnawi, which was translated into Italian by his wife.

Personal life
He was married to Carla Nûr Cerati Mandel (née Carla Cerati).
His body rests in the Muslim section of the cemetery of Bruzzano in Milan.

Publications
He was the author of some 200 books published by major Italian presses (Rizzoli, Mondadori, Rusconi, Longanesi, Edizioni San Paolo, Franco Maria Ricci, Bompiani, etc.), many of which have been translated into several languages, including English.

Books in English (selected)
 Japanese Alphabet: The 48 Essential Characters (2008), Abbeville Press 
 Arabic Script: Styles, Variants and Calligraphic Adaptations (2006), Abbeville Press 
 Concise Guide to Tarot (1995), Grange Books; 
 The Complete Paintings of Botticelli (1986), Penguin Classics of World Art; 
 Tantra - rites of love (1979), Rizzoli; ASIN: B001NOH50U
 How to recognize Islamic art (1979), Macdonald Educational; 
 The Life and Times of Genghis Khan; Portraits of Greatness (1970), Littlehampton Book Services Ltd; 
 The Life and Times of Mohammed; Portraits of Greatness (1969), Hamlyn; ASIN: B002AHV1QS
 The Life and Times of Buddha; Portraits of Greatness (1968), Hamlyn; 
 Siena, the city of the Palio (1959), Silvana Publisher; ASIN: B0007IYUOM

Books in Italian (selected)
  Alfabeto giapponese (2007), Milano, ed. Mondadori; 
  Islam (2006), (Dizionari delle Religioni) ed. Electa Mondadori; 
  Il Mathnawì di Jalàl àlDìn Rùmì (2006), edizione Bompiani, sei volumi; 
 La musicoterapia dei sufi (2006)  edizioni Arcipelago 
 Edizione economica del Corano (2005) ed. UTET; 
 La via al Sufismo nella spiritualità e nella pratica (2004) edito da Bompiani 
 Storia del Sufismo (2001). Edizioni Bompiani; 
 L'alfabeto ebraico (2000). Mondadori, Milano; 
 L'alfabeto arabo (2000). Mondadori, Milano;  
 La magia nell'Islàm (1997). Simonelli Editore; 
 Alla ricerca dell'Io. Lezioni di storia della psicologia (1985). Arcipelago Edizioni; 
 Essere e fare. Lezioni di storia e psicologia dell'arte (1984). Arcipelago Edizioni;

Awards

In Italy

Commander of the Order of Merit of the Italian Republic (Ordine al Merito della Repubblica Italiana) on 17 November 1975.

In Turkey
The Amphitheater 4 of the Selçuk University in Konya was named "Prof. Dr. Gabriel Mandel Khan" on 3 May 2010.

References

External links
 Official Website
 The Caravansarai
 Reflections on Gabriele Mandel Su Riflessioni.it

Sufi writers
Italian male writers
Italian Sufi religious leaders
Italian psychologists
Sufi artists
Italian people of Afghan descent
1924 births
2010 deaths
Henri de Toulouse-Lautrec